Idris Hadi Salih (born 1952) ادريس هادي صالح, is the Head of Board of Trustees and the President of Tishk International University, Erbil, Iraq. He has taken several ministerial positions in Iraq and Kurdistan Region. He is a former Minister of Higher Education and Scientific Research in the Kurdistan Regional Government (KRG) (2006-2009), former Minister of Labor and Social Affairs in Iraq (2005-2006), former Deputy Minister of Higher Education and Scientific Research in Iraq (2004-2005), former Minister of Municipalities and Tourism in KRG (1998), former Minister of Industry and Energy in KRG (1996) and former Minister of Transportation and Communication in KRG (1992-1996). Dr Idris also hold the position of president of Salahaddin University in Erbil, Iraq during 1999-2000, and head of Electrical Engineering Department, College of Engineering at Salahaddin University during 1985-1990. He speaks Kurdish, Arabic, English, Russian and some Turkish.

Education
Idris Hadi Salih earned his bachelor's degree in physics from Sulaimani University, Iraq in 1976. He then traveled to Russia and earned his master's degree in Communication Engineering at Leningrad University, Saint Petersburg, Russia in 1982. He also got a PhD Degree in Communication Engineering (Technical Science) at Leningrad University, Saint Petersburg, Russia in 1985.

References
 Tishk International University
 Kurdistan Regional Government - Fifth Cabinet
 http://www.news.appstate.edu/2016/01/07/higher-education-in-kurdistan/
 http://www.news.appstate.edu/2009/03/04/grant-kurdistan-universities/

1952 births
Living people
People from Erbil
Saint Petersburg State University alumni